Armand Couaillet (1865–1954) was a French clock maker from Saint-Nicolas-d'Aliermont in Normandy. 
 
In 1890 Couaillet started a business producing carriage clocks; shortly afterwards his three brothers join the business. By the turn of the century, the company employed about 100 workers and were producing 4000 carriage clocks each month.

On the eve of World War I, The Couaillet brothers employed 300 people and their catalog listed 250 models of clocks, but during the war, the focus of production switched to precision mechanical components for fuses, parts for aircraft engines and field telegraph systems.
 
In 1919, after a trip to the United States, he designed and began the production of the “Électricar”, a lightweight, three-wheeled, one-person electric automobile. Only 250 units are sold; the market demanded an internal combustion engine.  At the same time, he relaunched his horological business, producing primarily alarm clocks and timers.  In 1925 that business was bankrupt, and closed down.

References 

 Charles ALLIX et Peter BONNERT, Carriage Clocks. Their history and development, Antique Collector's club, 1974
 Cournarie Emmanuelle, La mécanique du geste, trois siècles d'histoire horlogère à Saint-Nicolas d'Aliermont, Édition PTC-Les Falaises, 2011
 Lolita Delesque et Marianne Lombardi,Armand Couaillet, horloger et inventeur de génie'', Musée de l'horlogerie, juin 2013, 44p

French clockmakers
1865 births
1954 deaths